Democracy Square is a public square in the Historic Centre of Lima, Peru. It is located on the former site of the Bank of the Nation Building, which burned down in the year 2000 during the Four Quarters March. The park's address is 1045 Nicolás de Piérola Avenue.

Overview
The square is located in the Historic Centre of Lima, one block away from the Plaza San Martín and one block away from the University Park. The headquarters of the National Jury of Elections (JNE) are located in front of the park on Nicolás de Piérola avenue. The park features a small monolith in its centre with the park's name.

The park is used for public events, such as book fairs, and protests, such as the 2022 Peruvian economic protests or the 2022–2023 Peruvian protests

History

Original building (1962–2000)

The plaza was formerly the location of a building that housed the Banco Comercial del Perú and later the Banco de la Nación. The building was designed by Peruvian architect Enrique Seoane Ros, and built by Flores & Costa, S.A., a Peruvian construction firm.

The building occupied an area of 3,114.78 m². It had a basement used for parking, safekeeping and a base with four floors designated to be used as office space. The building was topped by a tower with 10 extra floors, occupying a total area of 22,000 m² and costing an approximate $60 million.

The building's lower façade featured marble baseboards, wall coverings in glazed national ceramics and natural color anodized aluminum doors and windows. The windows in the first floor were reinforced and the rest were tinted. The lower facade also featured the name of its occupant, Banco Comercial del Perú, until it was changed to the logo of the Banco de la Nación, a circle with the bank's initials (BN) inside.

The building had 7 Schindler elevators meant for public use, plus an freight elevator for cargo. Most of the materials used in the building were specifically chosen to be from Peru instead of being imported from other countries.

The building's basement was the location of the bank's vault, which had a wood finish and was designed to be easily guarded. It was also the location of a discount section that could be accessed by anyone. The building's first floor was made of grey marble.

The first floor's wall that faced the Colmena avenue was decorated by a mural of Machu Picchu that measured 4 × 15 metres reproduced on canvas. The furniture was made of mahogany or aluminum and walnut. Another wall featured a collection of moneyboxes from different countries. The building's third floor had offices and a staircase with suspended steps made of concrete covered in carpet.

The building's office tower was designed to work independently of the bank building, being leased to private tenants.

On July 28, 2000, amid the protests that surrounded the building and the centre of Lima known as the Four Quarters March, a fire began inside the building. Despite claims by Minister of the Interior Walter Chacón of the opposite, the fire was caused by an explosion on the building's third floor which caused the structural integrity of the building's lower floors to be compromised, causing them to collapse and worsen the gravity of the situation. As a result, 6 security guards were killed in fire.

The explosion was reportedly caused by undercover agents acting under orders of Vladimiro Montesinos. The intent was to paint the protests in a negative light, and to link them to terrorist groups Shining Path and MRTA. The fire had been preceded by an attack on a policeman and his car, which was lit on fire, and riots caused by thugs paid organized by Carlos Regalado, who had been paid by Montesinos, to act as part of the crowd against law enforcement. The JNE building across was also set on fire. For his role in the bombing and the deaths of the six security guards, Montesinos was put on trial and sentenced in 2009 to 10 years in prison.

Once destroyed, and its structural integrity compromised, the building was condemned and demolished in 2005, with the basement being refilled with debris from the building. Plans to replace the building with a plaza were decided early on, with the new square's name originally being the Plaza of the Nation, and its original design varying significantly from its final result, as it was originally meant to feature a fountain in the centre, and murals related to the event.

Plaza (2006–present)
The current plaza differed from its original designs but was built and completed, being inaugurated on July 27, 2006. The inauguration ceremony was headed by now President Alejandro Toledo, who had participated in the 2000 march. His speech during the event referenced the fire and his anti-Fujimorist stance, referring to Alberto Fujimori's government as tyrannical. Kurt Burneo, the bank's president at the time of both the fire and the ceremony, was present in the event.

See also
Torre Banco de la Nación, which replaced the bank's former building

References

 Squares in Lima
Demolished buildings and structures in Peru
Buildings and structures completed in 1963
Buildings and structures destroyed by arson